Martha Bowes MacCallum (born January 31, 1964) is an American news host for Fox News. She is the host of The Story with Martha MacCallum, broadcast from Manhattan. MacCallum joined the network in 2004. Her interviews with President Barack Obama, General David Petraeus, Arizona Senator and 2008 Republican presidential nominee John McCain, New Jersey governor Chris Christie, First Lady Laura Bush, and others have been featured on her programs.

Early life

Martha MacCallum, the daughter of Elizabeth B. and Douglas C. MacCallum, Jr., was born and grew up in Wyckoff, New Jersey.  After graduating from Ramapo High School in Franklin Lakes, New Jersey, MacCallum earned her bachelor's degree in political science from St. Lawrence University in the North Country of New York State, and subsequently studied at the Circle in the Square Theatre School on Broadway, founding the Miranda Theater Company in New York. MacCallum next worked as an associate in corporate relations at Dow Jones & Company.

Broadcasting career 
MacCallum was at Wall Street Journal Television from 1991 to 1996, where she served as a business news correspondent and anchor for  The Wall Street Journal Report, World Market Outlook, and Business USA. In 1996, she moved to WBIS-TV, a short-lived sports and business station in New York, as an anchor and reporter.

MacCallum was next a reporter/anchor for NBC/CNBC. She frequently contributed to The News with Brian Williams, Today, NBC affiliate news programs, and CNBC World before being assigned to co-anchor CNBC's Morning Call with Martha MacCallum and Ted David. She also appeared on Checkpoint, an evening show which examined homeland security and the War on Terror. MacCallum created the series "Inside the Business" for Business Center, a former CNBC show.

Fox News 
MacCallum joined the Fox News Channel in 2004. She hosted The Live Desk from 2006 to 2010 and America's Newsroom from 2010 to 2017. MacCallum hosted the new program, The First 100 Days, on Fox News Channel, which debuted January 9, 2017. It was created as a replacement for Tucker Carlson Tonight when that program moved to the time slot formerly occupied by The Kelly File after Megyn Kelly's departure.
On April 28, 2017, the show was rebranded as The Story with Martha MacCallum.  At the close of 2020, upstart Newsmax surged while MacCallum and Fox plunged in the ratings. She was demoted on January 11, when her show "The Story" was moved from the prime 7 p.m. ET time-slot to the 3 p.m. ET time-slot.

After a mob of Trump supporters stormed the Capitol, MacCallum initially said, “This is a huge victory for these protesters. They have disrupted the system in an enormous way!” Later on during coverage of the events she called them "unsettling" and stated that "control has to be maintained." She likened the storming of the U.S. Capitol to a peaceful protest outside Josh Hawley's home a few days earlier; The New York Times said it was "bizarre" to link "swarms of Trump supporters breaking into the seat of democracy, an event that made worldwide news, to a small-scale incident at the home of a Republican official."

MacCallum is a two-time recipient of the Gracie Award for Women in Journalism and has received the Soldiersocks Commitment To Serve award. Some have also been critical of her for using the term 'China Virus' for COVID-19.

Personal life
Martha MacCallum married Dan Gregory on August 22, 1992, at St. Elizabeth Church, Wyckoff, NJ. Together, they have 3 children; two sons and a daughter.

See also
 New Yorkers in journalism

References

External links
 
 
 
 

Living people
American television news anchors
Fox News people
Television personalities from Buffalo, New York
People from Ridgewood, New Jersey
People from Wyckoff, New Jersey
Ramapo High School (New Jersey) alumni
St. Lawrence University alumni
American women television journalists
21st-century American journalists
CNBC people
Dow Jones & Company people
1964 births
21st-century American women